The 2022 Budapest FIA Formula 2 round was a motor racing event held between 29 and 31 July 2022 at the Hungaroring, Mogyoród, Hungary. It was the tenth round of the 2022 FIA Formula 2 Championship and was held in support of the 2022 Hungarian Grand Prix.

Driver changes 
After replacing Jake Hughes in Le Castellet, David Beckmann continued to compete for Van Amersfoort Racing after Hughes tested positive for COVID-19 during the Le Castellet round.

Classification

Qualifying
After clinching his maiden win in Formula 2 five days ago, Ayumu Iwasa clinched his first pole position by 0.381 seconds ahead of Marcus Armstrong, while championship leader Felipe Drugovich qualified in third right in front of Théo Pourchaire, his nearest championship rival.

Sprint race 

Notes
 – Richard Verschoor received a total time penalty of 30 seconds for failing to serve a time penalty correctly.

Feature race 

Notes:
 – Roy Nissany originally finished sixteenth, but was later given a ten-second time penalty for causing a collision with Roberto Merhi.

Standings after the event 

Drivers' Championship standings

Teams' Championship standings

 Note: Only the top five positions are included for both sets of standings.

See also 
 2022 Hungarian Grand Prix
 2022 Budapest Formula 3 round

References

External links 
 Official website

|- style="text-align:center"
|width="35%"|Previous race:
|width="30%"|FIA Formula 2 Championship2022 season
|width="40%"|Next race:

Budapest
Budapest Formula 2